The Miss Delaware Teen USA competition is the pageant that selects the representative for the state of Delaware in the Miss Teen USA pageant. It was formerly directed by Crown Productions from 1993 to 2007, then by D&D Productions from 2007 to 2018. CW Productions became the new directors for the pageant starting in 2019. In 2020, CW Productions was terminated.  The license to produce the 2021 state pageants was awarded to V&M Productions, LLC into the directorship of Vincenza Carrieri-Russo. This is only the second time that the pageant is produced by a former Miss Delaware USA.

The current titleholder is Ava MacMurray of Hockessin and she was crowned on April 3, 2022 at Laird Performing Arts Center in The Tatnall School in Wilmington. She will represent Delaware for the title of Miss Teen USA 2022.

Delaware winners and contestants 
In terms of number of placements and awards, Delaware is one of the least successful states at Miss Teen USA. However, Ashley Coleman broke the mold to win the Miss Teen USA crown in 1999. 
Miss Delaware Teen USA 2000, Carrie Aiken, and 2001, Christie Aiken, are sisters. Miss Delaware Teen USA 1997, Cheryl Crowe, was the first Delaware teen to cross over to the Miss Delaware USA title. Since Cheryl, Kelsey Miller (2009), Mia Jones (2014) and Sierra Wright (2015) went on to win the Miss Delaware USA title, in 2014, 2017 and 2018 respectively. Miss Delaware Teen USA 2011, Amanda Debus, was the first, and so far only, Delaware teen to cross over from the Miss Delaware's Outstanding Teen title, she is also the only successful MAO/MUO crossover in Delaware. Amanda Debus is the first USA titleholder to win Miss Delaware in the Miss America system.

Melissa King 

On February 26, 2013, Melissa King resigned her crown when confronted with a pornographic video; The former Miss Delaware Teen USA was paid $1,500 for the porn shoot. 

Hailey Lawler, the runner-up, replaced her.

Results summary

Placements
Miss Teen USAs: Ashley Coleman (1999)
Top 6: Dawn Huey (1995)
Top 15: Mia Jones (2014), Emily Hutchison (2016)
Delaware holds a record of 4 placements at Miss Teen USA.

Winners 

Color key

1 Age at the time of the Miss Teen USA pageant

External links
Official website

References

Delaware
Women in Delaware